There are several historical locations known as Fort Amherst:
 The fortress at Fort Amherst in England.
 The neighbourhood of Fort Amherst at the entrance to the harbour at St. John's, Newfoundland.
 Port-la-Joye—Fort Amherst, a Canadian National Historic Site on Prince Edward Island.

See also
 Amherst (disambiguation)